The Bristol 406 was a luxury car produced between 1958 and 1961 by British manufacturer Bristol Aeroplane Co. Their cars were constructed to very high engineering standards and were intended to be long-lasting to justify their very high price. Buyers might arrange considerable changes to the specification of their own particular vehicle. Bristol Aeroplane's car division later became Bristol Cars. 

It was the last Bristol to use the BMW-derived pushrod straight six engine that had powered all cars built by the company up to that point.  In a stopgap measure for the 406 its torque was improved by a 245 cc increase in capacity because it was clearly unable to give a performance comparable to that of newer engines emerging at the time.

Body

A prototype with a body by Carrosserie Beutler AG of Thun in Switzerland was exhibited in 1957 in both Paris and London Motor Shows. The start of production at Filton was announced in late August 1958.

Engine

Compared to the 405, the 406 saw several significant changes. The most important was that the six-cylinder engine itself was enlarged slightly in both bore and stroke to dimensions of 69 mm by 100 mm (2.71 inches by 3.94 inches). This gave an engine displacement of 2,216 cc (135 cubic inches) but the actual power of the engine was no greater than that of the 405. However, the torque was higher than for the smaller engine, especially at low engine speeds. 

Manufacture of the 2-litre version continued for supply to AC Cars for their AC Ace and Aceca.

Disc brakes

The 406 also featured Dunlop-built disc brakes on all four wheels (making it one of the first cars with four-wheel disc brakes) and a two-door saloon body Bristol were to stick with for a long period after adopting Chrysler V8 engines with the 407. The styling made the 406 more of a luxury car than a true sports saloon. It was, nevertheless, "a delight to drive".

The rear suspension of the 406 also did away with the outdated A-bracket of all previous Bristols for a more modern Watt's linkage. The 406 was the world's first production car to be thus equipped. However, the outdated front suspension of previous Bristols was retained and not updated until the following model with its more powerful drivetrain.

Zagato

Two short-wheelbase 406s, known as 406Ss, were bodied by Zagato. In all, there were only six 406s with Zagato bodies.

Replacement
The engine's ageing design was dealt with in 1961 by replacing it with a 5-litre Chrysler V8. The resulting car was renamed Bristol 407.

Notes

External links
 Bristol Owners Club, Bristol Type 406 - 2.2 litre Saloon
 Buying a Six-Cylinder Bristol

406
Cars introduced in 1958
Rear-wheel-drive vehicles
Sports sedans